Sarpayagam is a 1991 Indian Telugu-language crime tragedy film written and directed by Paruchuri Brothers starring Sobhan Babu, Vani Viswanath and Roja Selvamani in the lead roles. The film bankrolled by D. Ramanaidu under Suresh Productions had musical score by Vidyasagar. Rekha, Srinivasa Varma, Nagesh, Nutan Prasad and Brahmanandam essayed other major supporting characters. The film, based on true events revolves around a man who becomes a vengeful serial killer after his daughter gets brutally raped. Despite having a limited release, the film turned out to be a box office hit, garnering a positive response from critics and people. Actor Sobhan received acclaim for his portrayal of the revenge seeking father.

Cast 
 Sobhan Babu
 Vani Viswanath
 Rekha
 Roja Selvamani
 Srinivasa Varma
 Nagesh
 Nutan Prasad
 Brahmanandam
 Suttivelu
 Brahmaji
 Raja Ravindra
 Saikumar
 Honai
 Nagendra Prasad

Crew 
Writing, Direction : Paruchuri Brothers
Music : Vidyasagar
Editing : K. Madhav, K. V. Krishna Reddy
Cinematography : S. Gopala Reddy
Production : D. Ramanaidu
Art : Ashok
Stunts : Judo Ratnam
Costumes and Makeup : Hari and Subrahmanyam
Choreography : Sundaram and Siva Subrahmanyam
Lyrics : C. Narayana Reddy
Publicity Design : Eshwar

Soundtrack 
Vidyasagar scored and composed the film's soundtrack. C. Narayana Reddy penned the lyrics.

 "ABCD Gundelo" sung by S. P. B. and P. Susheela
 "Subhram Cheyna" sung by S. P. B. and P. Susheela
 "Chukka Chukka" sung by S. P. B.
 "Digu Digu Naga" sung by K. S. Chitra
 "Chali Raagam" sung by S. P. B. and K. S. Chitra

Awards
Roja won Nandi Special Jury Award for excellent performance in this film.

Citations

External links 

1991 films
Indian crime drama films
1990s crime action films
Indian crime action films
1990s Telugu-language films
1991 crime drama films